Toran is one of the two main branches of the Ghilji Pashtun tribal confederation. The other branch is the Ibrahimzai.

References

Ghilji Pashtun tribes